Ibrāhīm ibn al-Mahdī (779–839) was an Abbasid prince, singer, composer and poet. He was the son of the third Abbasid caliph, al-Mahdi, and the half-brother of the poet and musician Ulayya. Ibrahim was contemporary of Abbasid caliph al-Hadi, al-Rashid and his three nephews caliph al-Amin, al-Ma'mun, al-Mu'tasim.

Ibrahim's mother was Shaklah, a Negress. Her father was Khwanadan, steward of Masmughan. She had a brother named Humayd. She was acquired by Al-Mahdi together with Al-Bahtariyah, when she was a child. He presented her to his concubine Muhayyat, who, discovering a musical talent in the child, sent her to the famous school of Taif in the Hijaz for a thorough musical education. Years later Al-Mahdi, then caliph, took her as his concubine. She gave birth to Al-Mahdi's powerful and dark-skinned son Ibrahim.

During the Fourth Fitna, Ibrahim was proclaimed caliph on 20 July 817 by the people of Baghdad, who gave him the regnal name of al-Mubarak and declared his reigning nephew al-Ma'mun deposed. Ibrahim received the allegiance of the Hashemites. He had to resign in 819, and spent the rest of his life as a poet and a musician. He is remembered as "one of the most gifted musicians of his day, with a phenomenal vocal range", and a promoter of the then innovative 'Persian style' of song, 'which was characterized inter alia by redundant improvisation'.

Siblings
Ibrahim was related to several Abbasid caliphs. He was also contemporary and related to several Abbasid caliphs, princess and princesses. Ibrahim was at one point married to Abbasid princess Umm Muhammad.

References

Sources
 
 Kilpatrick, H. (1998). Meisami, Julie Scott; Starkey, Paul (eds.). Encyclopedia of Arabic Literature. Vol. 1. Taylor & Francis. p. 387. ISBN 978-0-415-18571-4.
 Al-Tabari; John Alden Williams (1988). Al-̣Tabarī: Volume 1, The Reign of Abū Ja'Far Al-Maṇsūr A. D. 754-775: The Early ‛Abbāsī Empire. Al-Tabari. the Early Abbasi Empire. Cambridge University Press. p. 46. ISBN 978-0-521-32662-9.
 Fishbein, Michael (2015). The History of al-Tabari Vol. 31: The War between Brothers: The Caliphate of Muhammad al-Amin A.D. 809-813/A.H. 193-198. SUNY series in Near Eastern Studies. State University of New York Press. p. 187. ISBN 978-1-4384-0289-5.

779 births
839 deaths
Poets from the Abbasid Caliphate

Medieval Arabic singers
Composers of the medieval Islamic world
Fourth Fitna
Baghdad under the Abbasid Caliphate
Male classical composers
One Thousand and One Nights characters
8th-century Arabic poets
9th-century Arabic poets
Sons of Abbasid caliphs
Singers of the medieval Islamic world